The 1919–20 United States collegiate men's ice hockey season was the 26th season of collegiate ice hockey.

Regular season

Standings

References

1919–20 NCAA Standings

External links
College Hockey Historical Archives

 
College